Zachary Daniel McClellan (born November 25, 1978) is a former professional baseball pitcher. He has played part of one season in Major League Baseball with the Colorado Rockies in 2007, and is retired from professional baseball.

An alumnus of Indiana University, McClellan made his Major League Baseball debut with the Colorado Rockies on April 16, 2007, against the San Francisco Giants at Coors Field. He became a free agent at the end of the 2008 season. After not pitching professionally in 2009, he pitched in four games for the independent Gary SouthShore RailCats in 2010.

External links

Major League Baseball pitchers
Colorado Rockies players
Spokane Indians players
Burlington Bees players
Wilmington Blue Rocks players
Tulsa Drillers players
Colorado Springs Sky Sox players
Tri-City Dust Devils players
Gary SouthShore RailCats players
Sportspeople from Toledo, Ohio
Baseball players from Ohio
1978 births
Living people
Peoria Javelinas players
Mesa Solar Sox players